A list of American films released in 1955.

The United Artists film Marty won the Academy Award for Best Picture for 1955.

A–B

C–D

E–H

I–L

M–R

S–Z

See also
 1955 in the United States

External links

1955 films at the Internet Movie Database

1955
Films
Lists of 1955 films by country or language